Asha O Bhalobasha is a 1989 Indian Bengali-language romance drama film directed by Sujit Guha and produced by Mamani Films. The film stars Prosenjit Chatterjee and Deepika Chikhalia in the lead roles. The music was composed by Bappi Lahiri.

Cast
 Prosenjit Chatterjee as Bijoy Thakur
 Deepika Chikhalia as Roopa
 Poonam Dasgupta as Pakhi
 Shubhendu Chatterjee as Bikash Sen
 Ruma Guha Thakurta as Roopa's Mother
 Utpal Dutt as Bilas Dutta
 Samit Bhanja as Gopal Sarkar
 Anup Kumar as Gobindo Daroga
 Shakti Thakur as Kanai
 Shakuntala Barua as Bikash Sen's Wife

Soundtrack

References

External links
 

Bengali-language Indian films
1989 films
Films scored by Bappi Lahiri
1980s Bengali-language films
Films directed by Sujit Guha
Films based on works by Shaktipada Rajguru